San Carlos de Bariloche Airport , also known as Teniente Luis Candelaria Airport, is an international airport serving the city of San Carlos de Bariloche, Río Negro, Argentina.

Airlines and destinations

Accidents and incidents

Accidents involving fatalities
13 May 1957: A LADE Vickers VC.1 Viking, registration T-3, flew into mountainous terrain,  out of San Carlos de Bariloche. All 16 occupants of the aircraft perished in the accident.
There were 52 fatalities.

Non-fatal hull-losses
16 August 1989: A LADE Fokker F28-1000C, tail number TC-51, failed to get airborne and overran the runway, being stopped by a dike.

Statistics

See also

Transport in Argentina
List of airports in Argentina

References

External links
 Official website
 Aeropuertos Argentina 2000
 
 

Airports in Argentina
Bariloche